Luca Giannini (born 17 June 2004) is a Welsh rugby union player who plays for the Scarlets as a flanker.

Professional career 
Giannini began playing for local side Llanelli Wanderers RFC, and played for Llanelli Schools U15 and Scarlets U16. A captain for the Scarlets U18 side, Giannini made his first appearance for Llanelli RFC in 2021.

In 2022, Giannini was selected for Wales U18.

Giannini made his debut for the Scarlets on 24 September 2022 against Ulster. Coming off the bench, Giannini became the second youngest player to represent the Scarlets.

Giannini was selected for Wales U20 in 2023, making his first appearance in a friendly against Poland. He was subsequently named in the full squad for the 2023 Six Nations Under 20s Championship. On 3 February 2022, he made his first appearance, starting against Ireland.

References

External links 

 Wales profile

2004 births
Living people
Scarlets players
Llanelli RFC players
Welsh rugby union players
Rugby union flankers